Stelton is an unincorporated community located within Edison Township in Middlesex County, New Jersey, United States.

Established in 1689, the Stelton Baptist Church is the state's second oldest baptist congregation.

The present-day NJ Transit Edison station was originally constructed  at Central Avenue and Plainfield Avenue and named “Stelton” after the Stelle family, early settlers in Piscatawaytown who arrived in 1668 and who were still numerous in the area in the 1880s. The Pennsylvania Railroad renamed the station to Edison on October 29, 1956, as part of the changing of names in Edison to reflect the newly honored Thomas Alva Edison. Stelton was home to an anarchist school and colony in the Ferrer school of thought for most of the first half of the 20th century.

See also
 List of neighborhoods in Edison, New Jersey
 North Stelton, New Jersey – section in Piscataway

References

Neighborhoods in Edison, New Jersey
Unincorporated communities in Middlesex County, New Jersey
Unincorporated communities in New Jersey